Khwar or Khvar may be:

 a placename component used in Greater Iran (see lists of articles with titles containing  and )
 Khwar Pass, a pass in Persia and the site of the 18th-century Battle of Khwar Pass
 a medieval city probably related to the ancient town of Choara

See also 
 Khavar (disambiguation)
 Khuwar (disambiguation)